Kashka may refer to:
 Kaskians, an ancient people of Anatolia
 Kashka, Armenia
 Kashka, Iran